Joseph Arthur Lesage (7 June 1881 – 9 March 1950) was a Liberal party member of the Senate of Canada. He was born in Louiseville, Quebec and became an insurance broker. He was the uncle of Jean Lesage.

The son of Hercule Lesage and Émilie Caron, he was educated at Louiseville College and the Laval Normal School. He married Emma Lachapelle in 1911. Lesage served as an alderman for Quebec City from 1918 to 1926. He was president of Lesage Proteau Ltd. and Les publications Cartier, Ltée and vice-president of Yellow Taxi Ltd.

He was appointed to the Senate for the Gulf, Quebec division on 3 March 1944 following nomination by Prime Minister William Lyon Mackenzie King. Lesage remained in that role until his death on 9 March 1950.

References

External links
 

1881 births
1950 deaths
Canadian senators from Quebec
Liberal Party of Canada senators
People from Louiseville